Giorgio Tonini (born 5 January 1959) is an Italian journalist and politician. He served in the Italian Senate from 2001 to 2018.

References

External links 
Official website

Senators of Legislature XIV of Italy
Senators of Legislature XV of Italy
Senators of Legislature XVI of Italy
Senators of Legislature XVII of Italy
Democratic Party (Italy) politicians
Politicians from Rome
21st-century Italian journalists
21st-century Italian politicians
Living people
1959 births